T. aureus  may refer to:
 Teinopalpus aureus, the golden kaiserihind, a butterfly species found in China and possibly Vietnam
 Thomasomys aureus, the golden Oldfield mouse, a rodent species found in Colombia, Ecuador, Peru and Venezuela
 Thorius aureus, a salamander species endemic to Mexico

See also
 Aureus (disambiguation)